Gujarat Common Entrance Test (GCET) is an annual common entrance exam for MBA and MCA studies in Gujarat, India, since 2002. Every year it is conducted between March to August. Gujarat Technological University was inaugurated in October 2007. Then, it started conducting GCET.

MBA programmes

Admission and exam pattern
There two types of admissions seats covered under GCET:
Grant-in-Aid (GIA) for University run departments. Fees are significantly low.
SFI (Self Financed) for private institutes.
The written test comprises sections on quantitative ability, reasoning, data interpretation, reading comprehension, verbal ability, and general knowledge.  Examinees can take the test in English or Gujarati.

Institutes covered
Few prominent institutes are:
 School of Management and Entrepreneurship, Auro University of Hospitality and Management, Surat
 B K School of Business Management, Ahmedabad
 Faculty of Management Studies, The M S University of Baroda, Vadodara
 Centre for Management Studies, Dharmsinh Desai University, Nadiad
 AES Post Graduate Institute of Business Management, Ahmedabad
 Som-Lalit Institute of Business Management Studies, Ahmedabad
 G H Patel PG Institute of Business Management, Vallabh Vidya Nagar
 R D Gardi Institute of Business Management, Rajkot
 Department of Business & Industrial Management, Surat

GCET 2009
5,429 MBA admissions were given. Out of it, 3,298 admissions were from Open/General category; while 1,463 from SEBC category. 7% seats are reserved for Scheduled Caste, 15% for Scheduled Tribes and 27% seats are for Socially & Educationally Backward Classes (including widows and orphans).

Note: GIA: Grants-in-aid, SFI: Self-financed

MCA programmes

See also
M S Patel Institute, FMS, The M S University of Baroda
Common Admission Test
B K School of Business Management
Gujarat University

References

External links
 Gujarat Technological University's Official Website
 GCET Official website
 GCET Resolution — Education Department, Government of Gujarat

Standardised tests in India
Education in Gujarat
2007 establishments in Gujarat